"Skeletons" is a number-one R&B single performed by American recording artist Stevie Wonder from his 1987 Characters album.

Song background 
The song is an R&B record about lies and deceptions being uncovered. The 12" extended version features short sound bites from prominent figures such as Col. Oliver North ("I am not ashamed of anything in my professional and personal conduct") and President Ronald Reagan ("The United States has not made concessions to those who hold our people captive in Lebanon") among others. This has remained a popular R&B uptempo song for Stevie Wonder, as well receiving airplay from urban radio stations.

Music video
The song's music video shows Stevie Wonder sitting on the front porch of his home, in a typical white-picket-fence American neighborhood. As the video progresses, he greets his archetypical neighbors, and we are shown who they are; then we are shown their "skeletons", or secrets. Karen Black is featured as the "perfect" mother and housewife who is secretly an alcoholic. Next is the businessman, a "pillar of the community" who cross-dresses in private. Then, the "all-American girl next door" is shown to be secretly being molested by her father. Lastly, we are shown the athletic "all-American boy next door" who is actually a cocaine addict.

Accolades
The song earned Stevie Wonder two 1988 Grammy Award nominations for Best R&B Song and Best Male R&B Vocal Performance, while the album Characters would be nominated the following year for Best R&B Male Vocal Performance.

Personnel 

 Stevie Wonder – lead vocals, synthesizers, drums, percussion
 Ben Bridges - electric guitar
 Robert Arbittier – synthesizer programming
 Dorian Holley, Alexis England, Kevin Dorsey, Darryl Phinnessee, Melody McCully, Keith John, Lynne Fiddmont-Lindsey, Shirley Brewer – backing vocals

Chart performance
"Skeletons" went to number one on the Black Singles Chart, and peaked on the Billboard Hot 100 at number 19, and was the final top 40 hit for Wonder to date. The single also peaked at number 20 on the US dance chart.

Popular culture
The song was featured in the 1988 action film Die Hard, played when the character Argyle speaks on the phone.
The song was also featured in the 2nd trailer and soundtrack of the video game Grand Theft Auto V, appearing on the fictional in-game radio station Space 103.2 FM.
The song was featured in the television show A Different World, season 1, episode 4, "Those Who Can't...Tutor" (1987).

References
 

1987 songs
1987 singles
Stevie Wonder songs
Songs written by Stevie Wonder
Song recordings produced by Stevie Wonder
Songs about cross-dressing